Laurent Henric (20 March 1905 – 3 March 1992) was a French footballer and coach.

A goalkeeper, he started his playing career at his local club, FC Sète. He was an international four times in 1928 and 1929. He then joined his first professional club with AS Saint-Étienne in 1933. He was also part of France's squad for the 1928 Summer Olympics, but he did not play in any matches.

He would coach équipe fédérale de Marseille-Provence in 1943-1944 and GSC Marseille from 1949-1951.

Honours 
 Finalist of the Coupe de France in 1924 and 1929 with FC Sète
 Champion of France D1 (Group B) in 1933 with Olympique d'Antibes

References

External links 
 Player page at the site of the FFF
 Player page at anciensverts.com

1905 births
1992 deaths
People from Sète
French footballers
France international footballers
Olympic footballers of France
Footballers at the 1928 Summer Olympics
FC Sète 34 players
AS Cannes players
FC Antibes players
AS Saint-Étienne players
French football managers
Olympique de Marseille managers
Association football goalkeepers
Sportspeople from Hérault
Footballers from Occitania (administrative region)